Working Dog Winery is a winery located on the border of Robbinsville Township and East Windsor in Mercer County, New Jersey. The vineyard was first planted in 2001 and opened to the public in 2003. The winery was originally known as "Silver Decoy Winery," but the name was changed in 2013. Working Dog has 17 acres of grapes under cultivation and produces 4,000 cases of wine per year.

Wines

Working Dog Winery produces wine from Cabernet Franc, Merlot, Cabernet Sauvignon, Syrah, Sangiovese, Chambourcin, Marechal Foch, Chardonnay, Viognier, Pinot gris, Riesling, and Traminette grapes. Working Dog also makes fruit wine from blueberries. The winery was a participant at the Judgment of Princeton, a wine tasting organized by the American Association of Wine Economists that compared New Jersey wines to premium French vintages.

Licensing and associations
Working Dog has a plenary winery license from the New Jersey Division of Alcoholic Beverage Control, which allows it to produce an unrestricted amount of wine, operate up to 15 off-premises sales rooms. The winery is a member of the Garden State Wine Growers Association.

See also 
Alcohol laws of New Jersey
American wine
Judgment of Princeton
List of wineries, breweries, and distilleries in New Jersey
New Jersey Farm Winery Act
New Jersey Wine Industry Advisory Council
New Jersey wine

References

External links 
Garden State Wine Growers Association

Wineries in New Jersey
Tourist attractions in Mercer County, New Jersey
2003 establishments in New Jersey
East Windsor, New Jersey
Robbinsville Township, New Jersey